Aliabbas Rzazade is an Azerbaijani freestyle wrestler competing in the 57 kg division. He won the silver medal in the 57 kg event at the 2022 European Wrestling Championships held in Budapest, Hungary.

Career 
In 2021, he won the silver medal in the men's 57 kg event at the 2021 European U23 Wrestling Championship held in Skopje, North Macedonia.

Aliabbas Rzazade won the gold medal in the men's freestyle 57 kg at the 2021 U23 World Wrestling Championships held in Belgrade, Serbia.

In 2022, he won the gold medal in his event at the Matteo Pellicone Ranking Series 2022 held in Rome, Italy. He won one of the bronze medals in the men's 57 kg event at the 2021 Islamic Solidarity Games held in Konya, Turkey. He competed in the 57kg event at the 2022 World Wrestling Championships held in Belgrade, Serbia.

Achievements

References

External links 
 

1998 births
Living people
Azerbaijani male sport wrestlers
European Wrestling Championships medalists
Islamic Solidarity Games competitors for Azerbaijan
Islamic Solidarity Games medalists in wrestling
21st-century Azerbaijani people